Dell is a computer design-and-manufacturing company.

Dell, Dells, or The Dell also may refer to:

Geography 
 Dell (landform), a small valley
 Dell, Arkansas, a town
 Dell, Minnesota, an unincorporated community
 Dell, Missouri, an unincorporated community
 Dell, Montana, an unincorporated community
 The Dell, Leamington Spa, a park in Warwickshire, England

People and fictional characters
 Dell (name), a surname, given name and nickname (including a list of people and fictional characters with the name)
 Michael Dell, founder and Dell Technologies

Businesses
 Dell Technologies, parent company of Dell Inc.
 Dell Publishing, now an imprint of Random House
 Dell Comics, the comic-book arm (1929-1974)
 Dell Magazines, the magazine arm

Buildings
 Dell Diamond, a minor league baseball stadium in Round Rock, Texas
 The Dell, Kingussie, a shinty stadium, home of Kingussie Camanachd in Scotland
 The Dell, Southampton, former home of Southampton F.C.
 Falmouth Town railway station, known as The Dell between 1974 and 1989
 The Dell, Thurrock, a concrete house in Grays, Essex, England, built by Alfred Russel Wallace

Other uses
 The Dells, a rhythm and blues musical act, starting 1952
 Dell Children's Medical Center of Central Texas, a pediatric trauma center
 Dell Medical School, the graduate medical school of the University of Texas at Austin
 Dell Bridge, a footbridge in Port Sunlight, Wirral, England

See also
 Dell City, Texas, a city
 Del (disambiguation)
 Dale (disambiguation)
 O'Dell (disambiguation)